Civet cat is an imprecise term that is used for a variety of cat-like creatures including:

Viverrids, species of the family Viverridae
Civets, common name for small, mostly arboreal mammals native to the tropics of Africa and Asia including most viverrids as well as the African palm civet and Malagasy civet, which are in separate families
Ringtail or North American civet cat (Bassariscus astutus), related to the raccoons
Spotted skunks, skunks of the genus Spilogale

Animal common name disambiguation pages